Prathyartha is a 1999 Kannada suspense-thriller film directed by Sunil Kumar Desai featuring Ramesh Aravind, Raghuvaran, Girish Karnad and Sudeep in the lead roles. The film features background score composed by Ilaiyaraaja. The concept of this movie is based on  the 1995 movie Nick of Time.

Cast
 Ramesh Aravind as Akshay / Robert
 Raghuvaran as Rakesh
 Girish Karnad as Home Minister of India Sheshanag Dixit
 Sudeep as Sudeep
 Avinash as Karthik, Home Minister's P.A.
 Shivaram as Madhav
 Kashi as Maruthi
Tharakesh patel 
K. D. Venkatesh 
Vinayak Joshi as Akshay (not the protagonist)
Sunil Kumar Desai as visitor in Lalitha Mahal Palace (Special appearance)

Production
The entire movie story revolves around the Lalith Mahal Palace in Mysore during Dasara season.

Awards

Karnataka State Film Awards :-
 Best Screenplay - Won - Sunil Kumar Desai (1998–99)

References

External links
 

1999 films
1990s Kannada-language films
1999 action thriller films
Films scored by Ilaiyaraaja
Indian action thriller films
Films about kidnapping in India
Films about assassinations
Films directed by Sunil Kumar Desai